This is a list of Estonian television related events from 1967.

Events

Debuts

Television shows

Ending this year

Births
5 April - Kärt Tomingas, actress and singer 
11 April - Liina Olmaru, actress 
6 June - Astrid Kannel, television journalist
9 July - Indrek Taalmaa, actor 
10 August - Mart Sander, singer, actor, director, author, and TV host

Deaths